Deshevikha is a rural locality (a village) in Bogorodskoye Rural Settlement, Ust-Kubinsky District, Vologda Oblast, Russia. The population was 114 as of 2002. There are 4 streets.

Geography 
Deshevikha is located 56 km northwest of Ustye (the district's administrative centre) by road. Ikhomovo is the nearest rural locality.

References 

Rural localities in Tarnogsky District